Fettercairn  is a small village in Aberdeenshire, Scotland, northwest of Laurencekirk in Aberdeenshire on the B966 from Edzell. Fettercairn is also reached via the Cairn O' Mount road (B974) from Deeside.

The name comes from  the Scottish Gaelic Fothair and the Pictish carden and means "slope by a thicket". The name appeared as Fotherkern in c. 970.

In the 2011 national census, Fettercairn had a population of 353.

Overview
The shaft of the old 16th century Kincardine Mercat cross stands in the square, and is notched to show the measurements of a Scottish ell.

A memorial archway erected in 1864 commemorates the 1861 visit by Queen Victoria and Prince Albert, while staying at Balmoral. Leaves from the journal of our life in the highlands describes aspects of their visit. Queen Victoria writes "At a quarter-past seven o'clock we reached the small quiet town, or rather village, of Fettercairn, for it was very small-not a creature stirring, and we got out at the quiet little inn, "Ramsay Arms" quite unobserved". "Louis and General Grey had rooms in an hotel, called "The Temperance Hotel" opposite". "The evening being bright and moonlight and very still, we all went, and walked through the whole village, where not a creature moved:- through the principal little square, in the middle of which was a sort of pillar or Town Cross on steps, and Louis read, by the light of the moon, a proclamation for collections of charities which was stuck on it". "Suddenly we heard a drum and fifes!". "As we walked slowly back, we heard the noise from time to time- and when we reached the inn door, we stopped and saw six men march up with fifes and a drum (not a creature taking any notice of them), go down the street and back again". "Albert asked the little maid, and the answer was, "It's just a band" and that it walked about in this way twice a week. How odd! It went on playing some time after we got home".

Historically Fettercairn lies at the southern end of the Monboddo Estate, where the Scottish philosopher and precursor of evolutionary thought, James Burnett, Lord Monboddo, lived.  Fettercairn houses the Fettercairn distillery (owned by Whyte and Mackay Ltd.) that produces the "Fettercairn 1824" single malt whisky.

History 
In 1504 Fettercairn was granted the status of a free burgh of barony, with the right to hold a weekly market and an annual fair that was dedicated to St Mark. The market and fair brought a period of growth and prosperity to the village which lasted until the village was sacked and burned by the army of the Marquis of Montrose in 1645 during as part of the Wars of the Three Kingdoms. Five years later, in 1650, Montrose would pass through Fettercairn, bound hand and foot on horseback, on his way to his execution in Edinburgh after being betrayed by Neil Macleod of Assynt.

The Fettercairn distillery was opened in 1824.

Education 
Primary education and nurseries services are provided in the village by Fettercairn Primary School. The school's catchment area includes the village and the surrounding rural area, it has approximately 70 pupils. The current school building was built in 1963 and originally had only two classrooms, it was extended in 1974, adding an additional two classrooms and a nursery room.

The majority of students travel to Mearns Academy in Laurencekirk to attend secondary school.

Gallery

See also
Fasque House
Fettercairn distillery
List of listed buildings in Fettercairn, Aberdeenshire
Monboddo House

References

External links

Villages in Aberdeenshire